UVB-76 (see other callsigns), also known by the nickname "The Buzzer", is a shortwave radio station that broadcasts on the frequency of 4625 kHz. It broadcasts a short, monotonous , repeating at a rate of approximately 25 tones per minute, 24 hours per day. Sometimes, the buzzer signal is interrupted and a voice transmission in Russian takes place. The start date of broadcasting is disputed. However, it was allegedly reported to have started broadcasting in the late 1970s, possibly 1976.

Name and callsigns
The station is commonly known as "The Buzzer" in both English and Russian. From at least 1997 to 2010, the station identified itself as UZB-76. The callsign UVB-76 was never used by the station itself, but is rather a mistranscription of UZB-76. However, the station is still often referred to by that name. In the following years of transmission, the main callsign of the station changed regularly.

In addition to these main callsigns, The Buzzer also uses other "side callsigns" which are being used less frequently than the main callsign. Whenever the main callsign changes, all previous side callsigns are also discarded. Instead of being limited to one single callsign, any amount of callsigns can be used in a message.

Format
The station transmits using AM with a suppressed lower sideband (USB modulation), but it has also used full double-sideband AM (A3E). The signal consists of a buzzing sound that lasts 1.2 seconds, pausing for 1–1.3 seconds, and repeating 21–34 times per minute. Until November 2010, the buzz tones lasted approximately 0.8 seconds each. One minute before the hour, the repeating tone was previously replaced by a continuous, uninterrupted alternating tone, which continued for one minute until the short repeating buzz resumed, although this stopped occurring in June 2010.

Since the start of broadcasting, The Buzzer broadcast as a repeating two-second pip, changing to a buzzer in the late 1980s/early 1990s. It briefly changed to a higher tone of longer duration (approximately 20 tones per minute) on 16 January 2003, but has since reverted to the previous tone pattern. These buzzes have gotten longer in duration and deeper in pitch over time, and breakdowns have been more frequent, suggesting the possibility of the buzzes being mechanically generated.

Voice messages
Sometimes the buzzing sound is interrupted and a voice message is broadcast. These messages are always given in Russian by a live voice, and follow three fixed formats:

Monolith 
A message in the Monolith format always consists of the following parts:

 Callsigns, each of which read out twice in the readout. A callsign always consists of four symbols, each symbol being either a Russian letter or a digit
 Five digit ID groups (amount of items usually follows the amount of callsigns)
 Message blocks, each consisting of one code word and eight digits

Example of a Monolith message sent on The Buzzer with exactly one callsign, one ID group and one message block (most common type):

Monolith messages can however contain any amount of items from each part:

Uzor 
A message in the Uzor format always consists of the following parts:

 Callsigns, each of which read out twice in the readout
 Message blocks, each consisting of one code word and four digits

Example of such a message:

Nowadays, Uzor messages are rarely sent on The Buzzer.

Komanda 
Komanda is the most uncommon type of voice message. Since it has not been heard for years, messages of this type are most likely not being sent on The Buzzer anymore. They consist of a callsign (read out twice),  (: OB'YaVLYeNA KOMANDA), and a following number. 

Example of such a message:

Unusual transmissions
Distant conversations and other background noises have frequently been heard behind the buzzer, suggesting that the buzzing tones are not generated internally, but are transmitted from a device placed behind a live and constantly open microphone. Because of the occasional fluctuating pitch of the buzzing tones, it is supposed that the tones are generated by a tonewheel as used in a Hammond organ. It is also possible that a microphone may have been turned on accidentally. 
One such occasion was on 3 November 2001, when a conversation in Russian was heard:

In September 2010, several unusual broadcasts were observed; these included portions of the buzzer being replaced with extracts from Tchaikovsky's Swan Lake.

On 11 November 2010, intermittent phone conversations were transmitted and were recorded by a listener (at 14:00 UTC) for a period of approximately 30 minutes. These conversations are available online, and seem to be in Russian. The phone calls mentioned the "brigade operative officer on duty", the communication codes "Debut", "Nadezhda" (Russian for "hope", both a noun and a female name), "Sudak" (an alternate name for the Zander, and also a town in Crimea) and "Vulkan" (volcano). The buzzing tone can also be heard very faintly in the background of these calls, further suggesting the buzzing is generated externally. The female voice says:

On 17 July 2015, the station broadcast what appeared to be a RTTY signal in lieu of the buzzer.

In January 2022, various signals with spectrogram-encoded images, visible through a spectrum analyzer, were broadcast on the same frequency. There have also been reports of various songs airing on the station's frequency, many of which were connected to internet memes such as the 2012 K-pop song "Gangnam Style"; a Vice article attributed these broadcasts to pirates hijacking and spamming the frequency. The nationality of the pirates has also come into question by Vice in relation to the 2021–2022 Russo-Ukrainian crisis and 2022–2023 Russian invasion of Ukraine.

Location and function

The purpose of the station has not been confirmed by government or broadcast officials. However, Rimantas Pleikys, a former Minister of Communications and Informatics of the Republic of Lithuania, has written that the purpose of the voice messages is to confirm that operators at receiving stations are alert. Other explanations are that the broadcast is constantly being listened to by military commissariats.

There is speculation published in the Russian Journal of Earth Sciences which describes an observatory measuring changes in the ionosphere by broadcasting a signal at 4625 kHz, the same as the Buzzer.

The most likely purpose is that the voice messages are some sort of Russian/Soviet military communications. The station being a numbers station for intelligence agencies such as the FSB or the former KGB of the Soviet Union is extremely unlikely as messages occur at seemingly random, unpredictable times, while numbers stations use a fixed schedule which changes rarely. In addition to that, the non-changing frequency of 4625 kHz and the low transmitter power are unsuitable for reliable communication from Russia to Europe, where spies would be stationed.

The buzzing functions as a "channel marker" used to keep the frequency occupied, thereby making it unattractive for other potential users. The signature sound could be used for tuning to the signal on an old analogue receiver. The modulation is suitable to be detected by an electromechanical frequency detector, similar to a tuning fork. This can be used to activate the squelch on a receiver. Due to the varying emission properties on shortwave bands, using a level-based squelch is unreliable. This also allows a signal loss to be detected, causing an alarm to sound on the receiver.

Another theory, described in a BBC article, states that the tower is connected to the Russian 'Perimeter' missile system, and emits a “Dead Hand” signal that will trigger a nuclear retaliatory response if the signal is interrupted as a result of a nuclear attack against Russia. This theory is also very unlikely, due to The Buzzer stopping / breaking down regularly, potentially triggering the Dead Hand by mistake.

There are two other Russian stations that follow a similar format, nicknamed "The Pip" and "The Squeaky Wheel". Like the Buzzer, these stations transmit a signature sound that is repeated constantly, but is occasionally interrupted to relay coded voice messages.

The location and callsign were unknown until the first known voice broadcast of 1997. In September 2010, the station's transmitter was moved to the nearby city of Saint Petersburg, near the village of Kerro Massiv. This may have been due to a reorganization of the Russian military. Prior to 9 August 2015, the station is not transmitted from the Kerro Massiv transmitter site ("Irtysh") anymore, possibly due to a reorganization of the Russian military for the particular area which may cause the frequency to be used only in the Moscow Military District. At present, The Buzzer appears to be broadcast only from the 69th Communication Hub in Naro Fominsk, Moscow. In 2011, a group of urban explorers claimed to have explored the buildings at Povarovo to find an abandoned military base and, in it, a radio log record confirming the operation of a transmitter at 4625 kHz.

Other callsigns 
Besides the main callsign, there have been transmissions containing different callsigns such as:

 LNR4
 87OI
 VM62
 A1JZh
 MSZh7
 OMP4
 7U8T
 VLHN
 217O
 ANVF
 VZhCH
 LNRCh
 VShchCH
 34ShchK
 YeDGShch
 58Shch1
 5Ye27
 M4Z2
 'M4T
 5PTsB
 LNTM
 ZhD9S
 28YA
 KhIZhJ
 53AJ
 AMVS
 V'TD
 YeIYJ
 ODVR
 TsZhAP

See also

 Duga radar (the "Russian Woodpecker")
 Letter beacon

References

Further reading

External links

 History and Info on The Buzzer
 NPR's Lost and Found Sound, 2000-05-26: The Shortwave Numbers Mystery
 UVB76 at the Global Frequency Database
 UVB-76 Temporary Internet Relay – Live Internet Streaming site, 900 km NW from station.
 UVB-76 Activity Updates
 Wired.co.uk 2011 article

Numbers stations
Radio in the Soviet Union
Radio in Russia
1970s establishments in Russia

Live stream from WebSDR
WebSDR in KO04SD.